Czarny Bór (Goral dialect: Crny Bór) is a village in Wałbrzych County, Lower Silesian Voivodeship, in south-western Poland. It is the seat of the administrative district (gmina) called Gmina Czarny Bór.

Settlement of Gorals from Podhale 
Whereas most of the former German and Czech settlements of Lower Silesia and the County of Kladsko were repopulated by Poles from regions east of the Curzon line and from war-devastated central Poland after World War II, Czarny Bór and nearby Borówno was settled by a group of Gorals. These Gorals from the Podhale region created a new home here as well as in the nearby village of Krajanów. While the new inhabitants initially cultivated their unique customs and folklore, these traditions have disappeared over time, although recently there have been efforts towards a cultural revival.

The village has a population of 2,000.

Notable residents
 Norbert Kuchinke (1940 – 2013), German journalist and actor
 Karl Abraham Zedlitz (1731-1793), Prussian minister of education

References

Villages in Wałbrzych County